Harry M. Colcord was the manager of the distinguished stuntman Charles Blondin, most famous for being possibly the first person to go across the Niagara Falls by piggyback on another person, in this case Blondin, on August 17, 1859. He was from Chicago.

References

Niagara Falls
Tightrope walkers
Year of death missing
Year of birth missing
19th-century circus performers